Frederick (1339 – 4 December 1393) was Duke of Bavaria from 1375. He was the second son of Stephen II and Elizabeth of Sicily.

Family
His maternal grandparents were Frederick III of Sicily and Eleanor of Anjou. Her parents were Charles II of Naples and Maria Arpad of Hungary.

Maria was a daughter of Stephen V of Hungary and his wife, queen Elisabeth, who was daughter of Zayhan of Kuni, a chief of the Cuman tribe and had been a pagan before her marriage.

Stephen V was a son of Béla IV of Hungary and Maria Laskarina. Maria Laskarina was a daughter of Theodore I Lascaris and Anna Angelina. Anna was daughter of Eastern Roman Emperor Alexios III Angelos and Euphrosyne Doukaina Kamatera.

Reign
From 1375 to 1392 he ruled Bavaria-Landshut jointly with his brothers  Stephen III and John II and managed to administer the richest part of the duchy, the region of Landshut which he also kept after the division of Bavaria among the brothers in 1392, when Bavaria-Landshut was reduced since Bavaria-Ingolstadt and Bavaria-Munich were created for his brothers.

In 1383 Frederick fought on the French side in Flanders against the English. He visited his uncle Albert I of Straubing-Holland in Quesnoy and participated in the siege of Bourbourg. On 1 November he went for an annual pension of 4000 francs in Paris in the service of King Charles VI, whose marriage to his niece Elizabeth he ran significantly. In the summer of 1385 he accompanied Elizabeth - later named Isabeau de Bavaria - to Amiens for her marriage with the King.

In 1387 Frederick imprisoned the archbishop of Salzburg to force him to finish his alliance with a confederation of cities in Swabia. Frederick was an advisor of King Wenceslaus of Bohemia in legal affairs and a favorable candidate for the king's succession when he died in 1393 at Budweis, South Bohemia. He was succeeded in Bavaria-Landshut by his son Henry.

Family and children
He was married twice. First, 1360 to Anna of Neuffen, daughter of Berthold VII of Neuffen. In this marriage he had only a daughter, Elisabeth (Isabella) (1361–17 January 1382), married to Marco Visconti, Lord of Parma.

Secondly, he was married on 2 September 1381 to Maddalena Visconti, daughter of Bernabò Visconti and Beatrice Regina della Scala. Their children were:
 Henry XVI the Rich (1386–1450).
 John, died young.
 Elizabeth (1383–13 November 1442, Ansbach), married to Frederick I, Margrave of Brandenburg.
 Margareta (b. 1384), died young.
 Magdalene (1388–1410), married in 1404 to Count John Meinhard VII, Count of Gorizia.

Ancestors

1339 births
1393 deaths
14th-century dukes of Bavaria
House of Wittelsbach